The British University Hurling Championship is an annual Hurling competition held for universities in Great Britain. It is organised by the BUGAA which is a branch of the Higher Education GAA committee which oversees Gaelic Games in Universities. Unlike its sister competition, the British University Gaelic Football Championship, this competition is not overseen by the British Universities Sports Association as yet.  The best players each year are chosen for an all-star team to play the Scottish Universities Shinty Team. The trophies for British University Gaelic Games Championships memorialise students who were pioneers of Gaelic Games at British Universities. The Michael O'Leary Cup is awarded to the winner of the British University Hurling Championship. It was presented to BUGAA by The Friary, Dundee. The Cup is named after a founder member of the hurling club at the University of Glasgow who died in 2001.

History 
The British University Hurling Championship took longer to get off the ground than its Gaelic Football counterpart, notwithstanding the long history of hurling v shinty tests between Irish and Scottish University teams. In 2001/02 efforts to organise a British Intervarsity Championship finally bore fruit, given an extra stimulus by the exhibition game played by Combined Universities selections of Ireland in 2000. The inaugural British University Hurling Championship was held in Glasgow at Pearse Park in April 2002. The initial tournament involved 'regional' teams plus the University of Abertay as the single university team, the inaugural winner managed by a Kilkenny native, Fr Eugene O'Sullivan. From academic year 2002–03 onwards the championship has been contested by single university teams.

The first single-university championship final was a local derby between the University of Dundee and the University of Abertay, Dundee, when the former took the title. The University of Dundee became the first British and Scottish University to compete in the Fergal Maher Cup Division 3 Hurling Championship. The University of Dundee has won the British University Hurling Championship three times, the University of Abertay once, the University of Glamorgan once, and Edinburgh Napier University seven times. The championship has been hosted in Glasgow, Dundee, Manchester and Solihull, near Birmingham.

The dominance of Scottish universities in this championship reflects the strong diaspora of Irish students at Scottish Universities as well as the presence of shinty clubs on campus which has helped in no small way to promote and develop the kindred Irish sport.

Roll of Honour

Colleges by Wins

Michael O'Leary Cup Champions

 2001/02 University of Abertay, Dundee
 2002/03 University of Dundee
 2003/04 University of Dundee
 2004/05 University of Glamorgan(now University of South Wales)
 2005/06 University of Dundee
 2006/07 Edinburgh Napier University
 2007/08 Edinburgh Napier University
 2008/09 Edinburgh Napier University
 2009/10 Edinburgh Napier University
 2010/11 Edinburgh Napier University
 2011/12 Edinburgh Napier University
 2012/13 Edinburgh Napier University
 2013/14 Edinburgh Napier University
 2014/15 Liverpool John Moores University
 2015/16 Robert Gordon University

Captains of Winning Teams

Man of the Match/Player of the Tournament Awardees

Match Details

External links 
BU GAA Website

References

Hurling competitions in the United Kingdom
Hurling
Hurling in Scotland
2001 establishments in the United Kingdom
Recurring events established in 2001
Annual sporting events in the United Kingdom
National championships in the United Kingdom